Big Creek Airport  is an airport serving Big Creek, a sea port in the Toledo District of Belize.

Airlines and destinations

See also

Transport in Belize
List of airports in Belize

References

External links
OurAirports - Big Creek Airport

Aerodromes in Belize - pdf

Airports in Belize